Chris Bailey may refer to:

Chris Bailey (musician, born 1950) (1950–2013), Australian musician, member of the rock bands The Angels and Gang Gajang
Chris Bailey (musician, born 1956) (1956–2022), Australian musician, co-founder and singer of rock band The Saints
Chris Bailey (artist) (born 1965), New Zealand Māori carver and sculptor
Chris Bailey (tennis) (born 1968), English tennis player, TV sports commentator and property consultant
Chris Bailey (ice hockey) (born 1972), American ice hockey player
Chris Bailey (rugby league) (born 1982), Australian rugby league player
Chris Bailey (animator) (born 1962), American animator and director
Chris Bailey (author) (born 1989), Canadian writer and productivity consultant
Chris Bailey Jr., American stock car racing driver

See also
Christopher Bailey (disambiguation)
Chris Baillie (hurdler) (born 1981), Scottish hurdler
Chris Baillie (politician), New Zealand politician
Christopher Bayly (1945–2015), British historian

 Bailey (surname)